The Paul Building is a high-rise office building located at 1018 Preston Avenue in Houston, Texas. It was listed on the National Register of Historic Places on April 6, 1979. Completed in 1907, the building has been home to a wide range of businesses and professionals. It housed the United States District Court in 1910, and with its proximity to the county courthouse, it became a popular location for attorneys. Its tenants have also included a newspaper, and the Y.M.C.A. The building changed its name to the Hoffman Building in 1918 and then to the Turnbow Building in 1927. It has been known as the Republic Building since 1923.

The building is eight stories tall, built of brown brink with load bearing walls. Terra cotta ornamentation includes several cartouches with a raised "P" representing the original owner, Allen Paul.

See also
 National Register of Historic Places listings in Harris County, Texas

References

Sanguinet & Staats buildings
Chicago school architecture in Texas
Commercial buildings on the National Register of Historic Places in Texas
Historic district contributing properties in Texas
National Register of Historic Places in Houston
Office buildings completed in 1907
Office buildings in Houston